The 2010 Atlantic Coast Conference football season was the 58th season of Atlantic Coast Conference football. The season started September 2, 2010 and ended January 9, 2011. The twelve conference schools were divided into two divisions. The Virginia Tech Hokies won the Coastal Division while the Florida State Seminoles won the Atlantic Division.  On December 4, 2010, the Hokies defeated the Seminoles 44–33 to win the 2010 ACC Championship and the right to represent the conference in the 2011 Orange Bowl, where the Hokies lost 12–40 to the Stanford Cardinal of the Pac-10.

Member schools

Coaches

ACC vs. BCS conference opponents
NOTE:. Games with a * next to the home team represent a neutral site game

Bowl games

Postseason

All-conference teams

First Team

Offense

Defense

Second Team

Offense

Defense

References